, was a career officer in the Imperial Japanese Navy during World War II. He commanded the battleship  during its final mission, Operation Ten-Go.

Biography
Aruga was a native of Nagano prefecture, and graduated from the 45th class of the Imperial Japanese Navy Academy in 1917, ranked 58th of 89 cadets. He served his midshipman duty on the cruiser  and battleship Hyūga, and completed naval artillery and torpedo warfare coursework from 1918 to 1919. After he was commissioned as an ensign, he served on a number of destroyers. From November 1922-November 1923, he was assigned to the battleship .

After his promotion to lieutenant commander in 1929, Aruga received his first command; the destroyer . After a shore assignment to the Chinkai Guard District from 1935 to 1937, Aruga returned to sea as the executive officer on the cruiser . He subsequently commanded 1st Minesweeper Division and Destroyer Division 11 (DesDiv 11), and was promoted to captain in November 1940.

In June 1941, Aruga was in command of DesDiv 4, which participated in  the Battle of Midway and in the Battle of the Eastern Solomons.

In March 1943, Aruga was reassigned to command the heavy cruiser . Recalled to Japan in June 1944 after he developed malaria, Aruga served as chief instructor at the Torpedo School until November of that year, when he was reassigned to the 2nd Fleet. On 25 November 1944, he was given command of the battleship .

In April 1945, under Operation-Ten Gō, Yamato was assigned on a suicide mission against the American forces at the Battle of Okinawa. Given only enough fuel for a one-way mission and only a cruiser and eight destroyers as an escort, Yamato was to wreak havoc on the American landing operation, and to beach herself on the Okinawa shore as a coastal fortress. On April 7, 1945, Yamato was sunk by waves of U.S. Navy carrier-based aircraft. Aruga went down with his ship. He was posthumously promoted two steps in rank to vice admiral.

In film
In Yutaka Abe's 1953 film 戦艦大和 Senkan Yamato (lit. "Battleship Yamato"), Aruga was portrayed by Takamaru Sasaki.
In Shūe Matsubayashi's 1963 film 太平洋の翼 Taiheiyo no tsubasa (lit. "Wings Over the Pacific", later released in the United States under the titles Attack Squadron! and Kamikaze), Aruga was portrayed by Seizaburô Kawazu.
In the second episode of Leiji Matsumoto's 1974 anime series Uchū Senkan Yamato 宇宙戦艦ヤマト (lit. "Space Battleship Yamato"), Aruga was voiced by Goro Naya.
In Shūe Matsubayashi's 1981 film 連合艦隊 Rengō Kantai (lit. "Combined Fleet", later released in the United States as The Imperial Navy), Aruga was portrayed by Ichiro Nakatani.
In Toei's 2005 war film Yamato (男たちの大和 Otokotachi no Yamato), Aruga was portrayed by award-winning actor Eiji Okuda.

Spelling of last name
Some sources render his last name as Ariga; the difference is due to an alternate reading of the first kanji character in his family name.

References

Books

External links

Sailing With Resignation Toward a Place to Die
http://www.asahi-net.or.jp/~un3k-mn/ren-ariga.htm
https://web.archive.org/web/20070906105447/http://www007.upp.so-net.ne.jp/togo/human/aa/kousaku.html

Notes

Japanese admirals of World War II
Japanese military personnel killed in World War II
1897 births
1945 deaths
People from Nagano Prefecture
Battle of Midway
Captains who went down with the ship